Stugeta occidentalis, the western marbled sapphire, is a butterfly in the family Lycaenidae. It is found in Sierra Leone. The habitat consists of savanna.

References

Butterflies described in 1958
Iolaini